Bradley George Thor Jr. (born August 21, 1969) is an American thriller novelist. He is the author of The Lions of Lucerne, The First Commandment, The Last Patriot, and other novels. His latest novel in the Harvath series, Rising Tiger, was released in July 2022. Thor's novels have been published in countries around the world. He also contributed a short story entitled "The Athens Solution" to the James Patterson-edited anthology, Thriller. Thor also makes frequent appearances on Fox News and The Blaze.

The Last Patriot was nominated for "Best Thriller of the Year" by the International Thriller Writers Association. His novel Blowback was voted by National Public Radio listeners as one of the "100 Best Ever" Killer Thrillers.

Early  life
Thor was born and raised in Chicago, and lived in Park City, Utah for eight years.

Thor is a graduate of the Sacred Heart Schools, the Francis W. Parker School (Chicago), and the University of Southern California (cum laude), where he studied creative writing under author T.C. Boyle.

Politics

Views 
Thor is a member of The Heritage Foundation and has spoken at their national headquarters on the need for robust missile defense.

Media 
Thor is a regular contributor to the Glenn Beck television program and has appeared on other Fox News Channel shows, as well as on CNN, ABC, CBS, NBC, MSNBC, and PBS to discuss terrorism and parallels between his novels and real threats facing the world today.

In May 2016, he made speculative comments on the Glenn Beck radio show about Donald Trump that appeared to offer conditional support for violence against him if Trump were elected and did something that he felt endangered the country.  Thor denied the comments were a call for assassination.

2020 presidential campaign 
Thor announced his candidacy for President of the United States in the 2020 election but on July 5, 2018, Thor decided against running and left the Republican Party, becoming an independent, citing frustration with the Republican-controlled Congress and President Donald Trump.
He later softened his tone toward Donald Trump as he would be a better choice than Hillary Clinton.

Bibliography

Scot Harvath Series
The Lions of Lucerne (2002)
Path of the Assassin (2003)
State of the Union (2004)
Blowback (2005)
Takedown (2006)
The First Commandment (2007)
The Last Patriot (2008)
The Apostle (2009)
Foreign Influence (2010)
Full Black (2011)
Black List (2012)
Hidden Order (2013)
Act of War (2014)
Code of Conduct (2015)
Foreign Agent (2016)
Use of Force (2017)
Spymaster (2018)
Backlash (2019)
Near Dark (2020)
Black Ice (2021, }
Rising Tiger (2022)
Dead Fall (2023)

The Athena Project Series
The Athena Project (2010)

References

External links
 

Living people
American thriller writers
American spy fiction writers
Techno-thriller writers
Tennessee Republicans
1969 births
Writers from Chicago
University of Southern California alumni
American male novelists
Schools of the Sacred Heart alumni
American critics of Islam
21st-century American novelists
Novelists from Tennessee
21st-century American male writers
Novelists from Illinois
Candidates in the 2020 United States presidential election

Francis W. Parker School (Chicago) alumni